Robert Rammer (born 14 April 1890, date of death unknown) was an Austrian road racing cyclist who competed in the 1912 Summer Olympics. He was born in Vienna.

In 1912 he was a member of the Austrian cycling team which finished seventh in the team time trial event. In the individual time trial competition he finished 23rd.

References

1890 births
Year of death missing
Austrian male cyclists
Olympic cyclists of Austria
Cyclists at the 1912 Summer Olympics
Cyclists from Vienna